William G. Brown is a Canadian mathematician specializing in graph theory. He is a professor emeritus of mathematics at McGill University.

Education and career
Brown earned his Ph.D. from the University of Toronto in 1963, under the joint supervision of Harold Scott MacDonald Coxeter and W. T. Tutte. His dissertation was Enumeration Problems Of Linear Graph Theory (Problems in the Enumeration of Maps).

In 1968, he moved to McGill from the University of British Columbia as an associate professor.

Contributions
Brown's dissertation research concerned graph enumeration, and his early publications continued in that direction. However, much of his later work was in extremal graph theory. He is known for formulating the Ruzsa–Szemerédi problem on the density of systems of triples in which no six points contain more than two triples in joint work with Paul Erdős and Vera T. Sós, and for his constructions of dense -free graphs in connection with the Zarankiewicz problem.

Selected publications

References

External links
Home page

Year of birth missing (living people)
Living people
Canadian mathematicians
Graph theorists
University of Toronto
Academic staff of the University of British Columbia Faculty of Science
Academic staff of McGill University